Millennium village may mean:
Millennium Villages Project, a project to reduce poverty in Africa by developing a number of villages, led by Columbia University.
Millennium Village, a closed attraction at Epcot
Millennium Communities Programme (or Millennium Villages initiative), an English Partnerships housing initiative